Eric Luke (born December 17, 1956 in Palo Alto, California) is an American writer.

Career

Film
Eric Luke began his career in film writing. Previous film work included: Explorers for Paramount Pictures, numerous screenplays for MGM and others, and also wrote and directed the latter two films in the Not Quite Human trilogy for the Disney Channel.

Television
Moving to television, he eventually wrote scripts for the Tales from the Cryptkeeper series and co-plotted the Gargoyles pilot five-parter for The Walt Disney Company. He returned to television to Executive Produce, Story Edit and script the Fox Kids TV animated series Xyber 9, which later aired on the Toon Disney channel. He would later write scripts for Teenage Mutant Ninja Turtles (2003).

Comics
His initial work in comics was Project: Overkill, a story drawn by artist Phill Norwood that appeared in Dark Horse Presents #30. Continuing with the Dark Horse Comics company, he then wrote the entire first series (1995–98) of Ghost, a run of 36 issues. He had also authored the Ghost Special during the summer of 1994. After Ghost ended, he moved onto the Wonder Woman series for DC Comics after his initial trial at writing that title's Annual #7 proved successful with editors.

Novels
His most recent work includes the novel Interference (2012) a meta-horror audiobook about an audiobook that kills, released free on iTunes.

Podcasts
Among his current projects is the podcast Extruding America, a deadpan satire in the style of Bob and Ray.

Filmography

Television
Tales from the Cryptkeeper (1993-1994)
Gargoyles (1994)
Ultraforce (1995)
Extreme Dinosaurs (1997)
Xyber 9: New Dawn (1999): story editor
Teenage Mutant Ninja Turtles (2003-2004)

Film
Explorers (1985)
Not Quite Human II (1989)
Still Not Quite Human (1992)

Bibliography

Dark Horse Comics
Ghost #1–36, Special #1 (1995–1998)

External links
 
 Extruding America podcast
 Interference Audiobook

Living people
American male screenwriters
American comics writers
American television writers
American male television writers
1962 births